Crematogaster augusti is a species of ant in tribe Crematogastrini. It was described by Emery in 1895.

References

augusti
Insects described in 1895